Emilio is a given name common in the Italian and Spanish languages. The Portuguese-language version of the name is spelled Emílio. Like its counterpart in other languages, Emil, the name is derived from the Latin Aemilius of the gens Aemilia. People with the name Emilio or Emílio include:

People

Given name (Emilio)

A–E
 Emilio Aceval, President of Paraguay
 Emilio Aguinaldo, Filipino general and President of the Philippines
 Emilio Aldecoa, Spanish association football player
 Emilio Álvarez (Uruguayan footballer), Uruguayan association football player
 Emilio Álvarez Icaza, president of the Human Rights Commission of the Mexican Federal District
 Emilio Álvarez Lejarza, Nicaraguan government official and jurist
 Emilio Álvarez Montalván, Nicaraguan ophthalmologist and a former Foreign Minister of Nicaragua
 Emilio Amero, Mexican artist
 Emilio Arenales Catalán, foreign minister of Guatemala and the president of the United Nations
 Emilio Arrieta, Spanish composer
 Emilio Artom, Italian mathematician
 Emilio Azcárraga Jean, Mexican businessman and Televisa owner
 Emilio Azcárraga Milmo, Mexican businessman and Televisa owner
 Emilio Azcárraga Vidaurreta, Mexican businessman and Televisa owner
 Emilio Baldonedo, Argentine footballer
 Emilio Banfi, Italian track and field athlete
 Emilio Barzini, fictional character in Mario Puzo's novel The Godfather
 Emilio Bello, Chilean lawyer, diplomat and President of the Government Junta that ruled Chile in 1925
 Emilio Benfele Álvarez, Spanish tennis player
 Emilio Betti, Italian jurist, Roman Law scholar, philosopher and theologian
 Emilio Bizzi, neuroscientist and Massachusetts Institute of Technology professor
 Emilio Bonifacio, Dominican Major League Baseball infielder
 Emilio Botín, Spanish banker
 Emilio Brambilla, Italian athlete
 Emilio Bulgarelli, Italian water polo player and Olympic athlete
 Emilio Butragueño, Spanish association football player
 Emilio Campos, Venezuelan association football player
 Emilio Carranza, Mexican aviator and national hero
 Emilio Castelar y Ripoll, Spanish republican and president of the First Spanish Republic
 Emilio Castillo, American saxophone player and composer
 Emilio de' Cavalieri, Italian composer, producer, organist, diplomat, choreographer and dancer
 Emilio Cavenecia, Peruvian military hero
 Emilio Coia, Italian-Scottish artist
 Emilio Colombo, Italian diplomat and politician
 Emilio Comici, Italian mountain climber
 Emilio Commisso, Argentine association football player
 Emilio Comte, Argentine actor
 Emilio Cornalia, Italian naturalist
 Emilio Q. Daddario, American politician
 Emilio De Bono, Italian General, fascist activist, Marshal, and member of the Fascist Grand Council
 Emilio Delgado, American actor
 Emilio Diez Barroso, Mexican businessman
 Emilio Disi, Argentine actor
 Emilio Echevarría, Mexican actor
 Emilio Esteban Infantes, Spanish general
 Emilio Estefan, Cuban-American musician and producer
 Emilio Estevez, American actor, director, and writer
 Emilio Estevez Tsai, Taiwanese association football player
 Emilio Estrada, President of Ecuador

F–M
 Emilio Falero, Cuban artist
 Emilio Fede, Italian anchorman and journalist
 Emilio Fernández, Mexican actor and screenwriter
 Emilio Ferrera, Belgian association football player and coach
 Emilio Floris, Italian politician
 Emilio Fraietta, Canadian football player
 Emilio Frugoni, Uruguayan socialist politician, lawyer, poet, essayist, and journalist
 Emilio A. De La Garza, United States Marine Corps lance corporal
 Emilio M. Garza, US Judge
 Emilio García Gómez, Spanish Arabist, literary historian, and critic
 Emilio Gavira, Spanish actor
 Emilio Gnutti, Italian financier
 Emilio de Gogorza, Spanish-American baritone singer
 Emilio Gómez, Ecuadorian tennis player
 Emilio González Márquez, Mexican politician and governor of Jalisco
 Emilio T. Gonzalez, head of USCIS (United States Citizenship and Immigration Services)
 Emilio Grau Sala, Catalan painter
 Emilio Gutiérrez Caba, Spanish actor
 Emilio Gutiérrez González, Spanish association football player
 Emilio Herrera Linares, Spanish military engineer
 Emilio Izaguirre, Honduran association football player
 Emilio J. M. de Carvalho, Angolan Bishop of the United Methodist Church
 Emilio Jacinto, Filipino revolutionary
 Emilio José Viqueira, Spanish association football player
 Emilio Kauderer, Argentine musician and composer
 Emilio Kosterlitzky, Russian polyglot, soldier of fortune, and spy for the United States
 Emilio Lara (weightlifter), Cuban weightlifter
 Emilio Largo, fictional character and main antagonist from the James Bond novel Thunderball
 Emilio Larrosa, Mexican TV producer
 Emilio Lissón, Archbishop of Lima
 Emilio Lowe, fictional character in Black Cat
 Emilio Lunghi, Italian Olympic athlete
 Emilio Lussu, Sardinian soldier, politician and a writer
 Emilio Martínez Lázaro, Spanish film director
 Emilio Martínez (footballer, born 1981), Paraguayan association football player
 Emilio Eduardo Massera, Argentine military officer
 Emilio Materassi, Italian Grand Prix motor racing driver
 Emilio Menéndez, Spanish politician
 Emilio Mwai Kibaki, 3rd President of the Republic of Kenya
 Emilio Mola, Nationalist commander during the Spanish Civil War

N–Z
 Emilio Navaira, Mexican-American singer (born Emilio H. Navaira III)
 Emilio Navarro, Puerto Rican baseball player
 Emilio Nsue, Equatorial Guinean association football player
 Emilio Núñez Portuondo, American who became a Cuban politician, lawyer, diplomat, and Prime Minister of Cuba
 Emilio Ochoa, Cuban politician and former Senator
 Emilio Oribe, Uruguayan poet, essayist, philosopher, and doctor
 Emilio Mario Osmeña, Philippine politician and activist
 Emilio Palacios, Nicaraguan association football player
 Emilio Palma, first person known to be born on the continent of Antarctica
 Emilio Palucci Calsani, Brazilian association football player
 Emilio Pérez Touriño, Galician politician and economist
 Emilio Pettoruti, Argentine painter
 Emilio Portes Gil, Mexican politician and president of Mexico
 Emilio Prados, Spanish poet
 Emilio Pucci, Italian fashion designer and politician
 Emilio Pujol, Spanish composer
 Emilio Rodríguez, Spanish professional road bicycle racer
 Emilio Ruiz del Río, Spanish film set decorator and special effects and visual effects artist
 Emilio De Rose, Italian dermatologist and politician
 Emilio Rubbi (1930–2005), Italian economist and politician 
 Emilio Sagi Liñán, Argentine association football player
 Emilio Sala (painter), Spanish painter
 Emilio Sala (sculptor), Italian sculptor
 Emilio Salgari, Italian writer
 Emilio Sánchez Font, Cuban artist
 Emilio Sánchez-Perrier, Spanish painter
 Emilio Sánchez, Spanish tennis player
 Emilio G. Segrè, Italian physicist and Nobel laureate in physics
 Emilio Sereni (1907–1977), Italian writer, politician and historian
 Emilio Serrano y Ruiz, Spanish pianist and composer
 Emilio Soriano Aladren, Spanish association football referee
 Emilio T. Gonzalez, American director of United States Citizenship and Immigration Services
 Emilio Taruffi, Italian painter
 Emilio Ulloa, Chilean long-distance runner
 Emilio Valle, Cuban hurdler
 Emilio Vedova, Italian painter
 Emilio Vieyra, Argentine film director, actor, screenwriter and film producer
 Emilio Vilà, French artist
 Emilio Villalba Welsh, Argentine screenwriter
 Emilio Villoresi, Italian Grand Prix motor racing driver
 Emilio de Villota, Spanish racing driver
 Emilio Zapico, Spanish racing driver
 Emilio Zavattini, Italian physicist
 Emilio Zebadúa, Mexican politician
 Emilio Zocchi, Italian sculptor
 Emilio, marquis Visconti-Venosta, Italian statesman

Given name (Emílio)
 Emílio Henrique Baumgart, Brazilian engineer
 Emílio Costa, Angolan singer known as Don Kikasmani
 Emílio Garrastazu Médici, Brazilian President
 Emílio Augusto Goeldi, Swiss-Brazilian naturalist and zoologist, also known as Émil Goeldi
 Emílio Lino, Portuguese fencer
 Emílio Peixe, Brazilian footballer
 Emílio da Silva, footballer

See also 

 Emilio Alvarez (disambiguation)
 Emilio Azcárraga (disambiguation)
 Emilio González (disambiguation)
 Emilios (disambiguation)
 Emílio (disambiguation)
 Emil (disambiguation)

Italian masculine given names
Spanish masculine given names